O Brasil É Aqui
  is a Brazilian TV Show broadcast by GNT (Cable TV channel).

It has a total of 26 episodes of 30 minutes each.

In English the title means "Brazil Is Here"

Episode List (partial)

O Brasil É Aqui-Beaches
Show the most beautiful beaches in Brazil.

Beach of Arembepe - Bahia.

Beach of Forte - Bahia

Itaúnas - Espirito Santo

Beach of Morro Branco - Ceará

Canoa Quebrada - Ceará

Ilha do Cardoso - São Paulo

Tibau do Sul - Rio Grande do Norte

Praia de Pipa - Rio Grande do Norte

Ilha Bela - São Paulo

Caraiva - Bahia

Praia da Lagoinha - Ceará

Ilha Grande - Rio de Janeiro

References

Brazilian television series
Portuguese-language television shows